Paragus quadrifasciatus is a species of syrphid fly in the family Syrphidae.

Distribution
France.

References

Syrphinae
Insects described in 1822
Diptera of Europe
Taxa named by Johann Wilhelm Meigen